Max Fleischer (1883–1972) was an American cartoonist and animation pioneer, known for Betty Boop and Popeye the Sailor

Max Fleischer may refer to:

 Max Fleischer (architect) (1841–1905), Austrian architect
 Max Fleischer (painter) (1861–1930), German painter and botanist
 Max Fleischer (author) (1880–1941), German-Austrian jurist and author

See also 

 Fleischer Studios